Artocarpus lacucha, also known as monkey jack or monkey fruit, is a tropical evergreen tree species of the family Moraceae. It is distributed throughout the Indian Subcontinent and Southeast Asia. The tree is valued for its wood; its fruit is edible and is believed to have medicinal value. In Northeastern Thailand, the wood is used to make pong lang, a local traditional instrument.

The stilbenoid oxyresveratrol can be isolated from the heartwood of Artocarpus lacucha as well as in Puag Haad, the light brown powder obtained from the aqueous extract of the wood chips of A. lakoocha by boiling, then slow evaporation, followed by cooling. This traditional drug is effective against the intestinal fluke Haplorchis taichui or against taeniasis.

This tree is mentioned in the Arthashastra.

See also
 Domesticated plants and animals of Austronesia
 Barharwa: A town in India named after the Hindi word for Artocarpus lacucha (Barhar)

References

External links 

Antioxidant and toxicity activities of Artocarpus lakoocha Roxb. heartwood extract
Fruit with foliage
Crops for the Future: Barhal (Artocarpus lakoocha)

lacucha
Flora of the Indian subcontinent
Flora of Indo-China